Introdacqua is a comune and town in the Province of L'Aquila in the Abruzzo region of Italy.

Introdacqua is part of Valle Peligna although it is set between Contra and S. Antonio Valleys.

History

The name 
Introdacqua, "Ndredacque" in local dialect, was anciently called Interaquas, a Latin expression which means that it was built "in the water", due to the water abundance in the territory,

Notable people
Ilio DiPaolo (1926-1995) - professional wrestler

References

Cities and towns in Abruzzo
Hilltowns in Abruzzo